German submarine U-225 was a Type VIIC U-boat of Nazi Germany's Kriegsmarine during World War II.

Ordered on 15 August 1940 from the Germaniawerft shipyard in Kiel, she was laid down on 3 September 1941 as yard number 655, launched on 28 May 1942 and commissioned on 11 July.

Design
German Type VIIC submarines were preceded by the shorter Type VIIB submarines. U-225 had a displacement of  when at the surface and  while submerged. She had two shafts and two  propellers.

U-225 was fitted with five  torpedo tubes (four fitted at the bow and one at the stern), fourteen torpedoes, one  SK C/35 naval gun, 220 rounds, and an anti-aircraft gun. The boat had a complement of between forty-four and sixty.

Service history

First patrol
She departed from Kiel on her first patrol on 5 December 1942. It was during this patrol that she successfully attacked five vessels in convoy ONS 154. She returned to Brest on 8 January 1943.

Final Patrol
Less than one month later, she departed from Brest on her second and final patrol on 2 February 1943. After just 21 days, she was sunk.

Fate

Summary of raiding history

References

Bibliography

External links

1942 ships
German Type VIIC submarines
U-boats sunk in 1943
U-boats sunk by depth charges
U-boats sunk by British warships
Ships lost with all hands
U-boats commissioned in 1942
World War II submarines of Germany
World War II shipwrecks in the Atlantic Ocean
Ships built in Kiel
Maritime incidents in February 1943